Victor Masselin, real name Victor Jean-Baptiste Masselin, (1804 in Paris – 16 May 1855 ) was a French playwright.

His plays were presented at the Gymnase-Enfantin, at the Théâtre de l'Ambigu-Comique, at the Folies-dramatiques, at the Théâtre-Français and at the Théâtre des Variétés.

Works 
1835: Le Fils de Figaro, comédie en vaudevilles en 1 act, avec Edmond Burat de Gurgy
1836: Les Deux jumelles, comédie en vaudevilles in 1 act
1839: Le Roi de carreau, vaudeville in 1 act, with Jules Chabot de Bouin
1839: Les Trois lièvres, vaudeville in 1 act
1843: L'Art et le Métier, comedy in 1 act and in verses, with Xavier Veyrat

Notes and references 

19th-century French dramatists and playwrights
Place of birth missing
1804 births
1855 deaths